"Money" is a song by industrial rock group KMFDM from their 1992 album of the same name. It was released as a single in 1992, and released as a 7" in 2008, as the ninth release of KMFDM's 24/7 series. The song charted at No. 36 in July 1992 on Billboard's Dance/Club Play Songs Chart. The tracks on the single are included on the singles compilation album, Extra, Vol. 1.

Track listing

1992 release

2008 7" reissue

Personnel
Sascha Konietzko – vocals, bass (1, 3, 5, 7), drums (1, 3, 5, 7), synths (2, 4, 6), programming
Günter Schulz – guitars
En Esch – vocals (1, 3, 5, 7)
Chrissie DeWinter - vocals (1, 3, 5, 7)
Dorona Alberti - vocals (2, 4, 6)

References

1992 singles
KMFDM songs
1992 songs
Wax Trax! Records singles
Songs written by Sascha Konietzko
Songs written by Günter Schulz
Songs written by En Esch